Waldemar Nowicki (born January 23, 1961) is a Polish footballer.

Career
Waldemar Nowicki has played a great deal of his career with B71 Sandoy, but has also played football for several Polish teams. He was very well known on the Faroe Islands for being a part of B71's successful stint in the early 1990s. He played his last game for B71 Sandoy in 2013. He has assisted several of B71's head-coaches, and has himself taken on the head-coach job, even though it was only for the second part of the 2003 season.

References

1961 births
Living people
Polish footballers
B71 Sandoy players
Expatriate footballers in the Faroe Islands
Place of birth missing (living people)
Association football goalkeepers